2015–16 Iran Football's 2nd Division  is the 15th under 2nd Division since its establishment (current format) in 2001. The season featured 25 teams from the 2nd Division 2014–15, seven new teams relegated from the 2014–15 Azadegan League: Tarbiat Novin, Naft Gachsaran, Niroo Zamini, Etka Gorgan, Sh. Bandar Abbas, Rahian Kermanshah, Esteghlal Ahvaz and four new teams promoted from the 3rd Division 2014–15: Moghavemat Tehran, Kara Shiraz, Shahrdari Mahshahr, Rahpouyan Rezvanshahr.

Teams

Stadia and locations

Number of teams by region

First round

Group A

Group B

Group C

Group D

Second round

Group A

Group B

2nd Division  Play-off 

Pars Jonoubi Jam as 2nd-placed team of Group A will faced Naft va Gaz Gachsaran as 2nd-placed team of Group B in a two-legged play-off.

Pars Jonoubi Jam won 4–0 on aggregate and promoted to the next season of Azadegan League.

References

League 2 (Iran) seasons
3